Denis Lunghi (born 21 January 1976) is an Italian former professional racing cyclist. He rode in three editions of the Giro d'Italia.

Major results

1998
2nd GP Palio del Recioto
3rd GP di Poggiana
7th Overall Giro Ciclistico d'Italia
1st Stage 1
1999
2nd Overall Tour of Japan
2000
1st GP Industria Artigianato e Commercio Carnaghese
2nd Coppa Agostoni
5th Giro di Toscana
6th Trofeo Melinda
8th Overall Peace Race
2001
1st Giro del Friuli
3rd Coppa Bernocchi
3rd Trofeo dello Scalatore
6th Trofeo Laigueglia
6th Giro di Romagna
8th Gran Premio della Costa Etruschi
9th Giro del Veneto
9th GP Industria & Commercio di Prato
2002
1st Stage 12 Giro d'Italia
6th Stausee Rundfahrt
6th GP Industria Artigianato e Commercio Carnaghese
2003
1st Stage 6 Tour of Qinghai Lake
8th Brixia Tour

References

External links
 

1976 births
Living people
Italian male cyclists
People from Biella
Cyclists from Piedmont
Sportspeople from the Province of Biella